Robert Daniel Armstrong (25 July 1872 – 3 June 1951) was an Australian rules footballer who played with Carlton in the Victorian Football Association (VFA) and the Victorian Football League (VFL).

Sources

External links

Bob Armstrong's profile at Blueseum

Carlton Football Club (VFA) players
Carlton Football Club players
1875 births
1951 deaths
Australian rules footballers from Melbourne